The Putnam Museum and Science Center, formerly Davenport Academy of Natural Sciences, is a museum of history and natural science and a science center in Davenport, Iowa, United States.  The museum was founded in 1867, and was one of the first museums west of the Mississippi River. It houses 160,000 historical artifacts and specimens and a giant screen theater.  It is located at 1717 West 12th Street, at the corner of Division and West 12th Street on "museum hill," near Fejervary Park. It is an affiliate of the Smithsonian Institution.

History
The Davenport Academy of Natural Sciences was started in 1867 on Brady Street as one of the earliest museums in the West. The Charles E. and Mary Louisa Duncan Putnam family of Davenport was an early strong supporter started base on their son's, Joseph Duncan, interest in insects.

Later, the academy was renamed after the Putnam family. Also, the museum  moved in 1964 to 1717 West 12th Street in Davenport, its current site.

Starting in 1997, the museum was losing money on operations and began to use its endowment to make up the short fall. In 2002, the museum opened an Imax theater at a cost of $14.5 million for which the board of directors took out a loan. The theater was a money maker for the institute, while its debt added to its losses. Soon its development director position went vacant in December 2005; followed by the executive director, Chris Reich, left in January 2006. Mark Bawden became the interim director and raised  enough funds by  April 2007 to retire the Imax debt. He then stepped down to the development director post, while on May 15, 2007, Kim Findlay started as the new executive director. Bawden the started a campaign to replenish the endowments.

The Putnam Museum removed its IMAX system for twin DLP projectors in June 2012, then affiliated with National Geographic Cinema Ventures' Museum Partnership Program.

On July 1, 2019, Rachael Mullins started as the president and CEO.

In January 2021, the Putnam joined Museums for All offering discounted admission for those receiving food assistance (SNAP benefits) by presenting their EBT card.

Exhibits 
Black Earth, Big River is an exploration of the past and present habitats of the Quad-Cities region.  Black Earth, Big River, the newest permanent exhibit in the museum features a 718-gallon aquarium filled with river fish, a cave, and a huge oak tree.  Habitats and wildlife are explained throughout the exhibit, along with stories of the region.

Hall of Mammals explains various mammals through many means.  Photographs, hands-on activities, and realistic dioramas are all provided in this multi-sensory exhibit. From the Arctic polar bears to the African zebras, many different animals are explored in this exhibit.

Unearthing Ancient Egypt transports you into an ancient tomb. Discover how ancient Egyptians lived and what they required for a pleasant afterlife.

River, Prairie, and People explores regional history.

World Culture Gallery celebrates the diverse cultures of our community by featuring artifacts from our international collection including objects from the world travels of some of the museum's founders such as the Putnam, Palmer, and Figge families.

Science Center is part of the museum's focus on science, technology, engineering and math (STEM) education, and supports national and statewide efforts to increase STEM skills. The area features large-scale interactives.

Giant Screen Theater
The theater has one of the largest movie screens in the state of Iowa, 57' by 70'.

In 2002, the museum opened an Imax theater at a cost of $14.5 million for which the board of directors took out a loan. The theater was a money maker for the institute, while its debt added to its losses. They then associated with IMAX large screen theater corporation as Putnam Museum and IMAX Theatre.

The Putnam Museum removed its IMAX system for twin DLP projectors renaming the theater to Putnam Giant Screen Theater in June 2012. Then affiliated with National Geographic Cinema Ventures's Museum Partnership Program as "National Geographic Giant Screen Theater" in June 2012. The partnership with National Geographic allows the Putnam access to one of the world's largest Giant-Screen film libraries in 2D and 3D digital formats.

References

External links
 

Museums in Davenport, Iowa
Natural history museums in Iowa
Natural history museums in the United States
Modernist architecture in Iowa
Culture of the Quad Cities
Science centers
1867 establishments in Iowa
Museums established in 1867